The men's K-1 1000 metres event was an individual kayaking event conducted as part of the Canoeing at the 1988 Summer Olympics program.

Medalists

Results

Heats
The 19 competitors first raced in three heats on September 27. The top three finishers from each of the heats advanced directly to the semifinals. All remaining competitors competed in the repechages later that day.

Repechages
Taking place on September 27, two repechages were held. The top three finishers in each repechage advanced to the semifinals.

Semifinals
Raced on September 29, the top three finishers from each of the three semifinals advanced to the final.

Boccara had qualified for the final, but withdrew and was replaced by Thompson for reasons not disclosed in the official report.

Final
The final took place on October 1.

References
1988 Summer Olympics official report Volume 2, Part 2. pp. 337–8. 
Sports-reference.com 1988 K-1 1000 m results.
Wallechinsky, David and Jaime Loucky (2008). "Canoeing: Men's Kayak Singles 1000 Meters". In The Complete Book of the Olympics: 2008 Edition. London: Aurum Press Limited. p. 472.

Men's K-1 1000
Men's events at the 1988 Summer Olympics